A list of films produced in Italy in 2001 (see 2001 in film):

See also
2001 in Italy
2001 in Italian television

External links
Italian films of 2001 at the Internet Movie Database

2001
Films
Italian